The 1996 Superbike World Championship was the ninth FIM Superbike World Championship season. The season started on 14 April at Misano and finished on 27 October at Phillip Island after 12 rounds.

Troy Corser won the riders' championship with 7 victories and Ducati won the manufacturers' championship.

Race calendar and results

Championship standings

Riders' standings

Manufacturers' standings

References

External links

Superbike World Championship
Superbike World Championship seasons